Joe Public Football Club is a football club from Trinidad and Tobago that used to play in the TT Pro League. Nicknamed the Eastern Lions, it is owned by former FIFA vice-president Jack Warner. Joe Public also sponsors the Munroe Road Cricket Club.

History
Following the disappointment in 1996 of the Trinidad national team, which saw the country fail to qualify for World Cup 1998, Austin "Jack" Warner proposed that creating a league to produce home grown players would function as the building blocks to qualify for the next World Cup in Japan and South Korea. Thus, the need for a professional league and the ability for clubs to operate as business entities, the Joe Public Football Club was formed.

After entering and winning the Eastern Football Association's Competitions in 1996, Joe Public qualified for and won the Trinidad and Tobago Football Association's Champion of Champions Tournament. This allowed the club entry into the Semi-Professional Football League (SPFL) after only one season in existence. During the beginning years of the club's existence, Joe Public had established an operative football office with paid staff and employed several players from countries throughout the Caribbean, Nicaragua, Mexico and Brazil.

The club finished second in their first season of the SPFL in 1997, and in 1998 they won the Champions' League Tournament, the Craven A SPFL League title, and the CFU Caribbean Club Championship.

However, in 2004, Joe Public withdrew from the Professional Football League to play in the National Super League, Trinidad and Tobago's second division, but returned after two years for the 2006 season, in which they clinched the league championship title.

In November 2007, as a result going undefeated through the group stage of the CFU Club Championship 2007, Joe Public advanced to the knockout rounds after decisive wins over Sagicor South East United from Dominica 5–0, and SV Racing Club Aruba 7–0. In the quarterfinals they defeated Bassa F.C. from Antigua and Barbuda 4–0 and then in the semifinals, Joe Public upended the Puerto Rico Islanders 1–0 to advance to the final. On 16 November, Joe Public fell to Harbour View of Jamaica 1–2 to finish runner-up. However, due to the reorganized CONCACAF Champions' Cup into the CONCACAF Champions League, Joe Public qualified for the Champions League in August 2008.

2008–09 CONCACAF Champions League

On 26 August 2008, Joe Public faced the New England Revolution, from the United States in the first leg of the preliminary round in the CONCACAF Champions League 2008–09. The Eastern Lions defeated New England Revolution 2–1 in front of a crowd of 2,100 at the Marvin Lee Stadium. Then, on the return leg before 3,523 spectators in Foxborough, Massachusetts, Public used a hat trick from Gregory Richardson in routing New England Revolution 4–0 in Gillette Stadium to advance to the group stage on a 6–1 aggregate score. With the result, Joe Public became the first Caribbean club to defeat a team from the United States in a CONCACAF club competition. In addition, Public were also the first to score as many as three goals against a club from the United States.

In the group stage, Joe Public were drawn with Atlante, Olimpia, and Montreal Impact. On 17 September 2008, Joe Public did not start the group stage on a positive note, falling 2–0 to Montreal Impact in Montreal. The Eastern Lions home opener for the CONCACAF Champions League did not go well either, as Joe Public lost 3–1 to C.D. Olimpia in the Marvin Lee Stadium giving the club no points from its first two games in the group stage. However, in their third game, Joe Public traveled to Cancun, Mexico and defeated Atlante 1–0. On 8 October, Joe Public lost another game in the group stage. This time they fell to Montreal Impact again 4–1, slashing the chances of Joe Public advancing beyond the group stage. With the loss to Atlante 2–0 in Cancún, Mexico on 21 October, Public was officially eliminated from the CONCACAF Champions League 2008–09. Finally, to finish the group stage, Public travelled to Tegucigalpa, Honduras to face Olimpia. They lost the match 4–0 to end their run in the CONCACAF Champions League with a record of 3–0–5 in the competition, with a disappointing 1–0–5 record in the group stage to finish at the bottom of their group.

Only two days after a loss to Montreal Impact in the CONCACAF Champions League, Joe Public needed a goal from Gregory Richardson in the 47th minute to defeat San Juan Jabloteh 1–0. With the win Joe Public advanced to the final of the First Citizens Cup. However, in the final, W Connection won a thrilling match, which saw Joe Public level the score 2–2 in the second half following a goal from Keyeno Thomas. But Public eventually lost the game on penalty kicks 6–5.

Recent events
In 2011, Joe Public withdraw from TT proleague due to issues arising from owner Jack warner 
In 2014, the club withdrew from Super League due to financial reasons

Stadium
Marvin Lee Stadium (1996–)

Joe Public plays their home games at the Marvin Lee Stadium located at the Dr. João Havelange Centre of Excellence in Tunapuna. The stadium serves as a multi-use stadium which has a capacity of approximately 6,000. The stadium was named after the national U-20 football captain, a standout defender at the time, who sustained head and neck injuries suffered in a collision with Landon Donovan in an U-20 game against the United States. He was left paralysed after the incident and died of illness as a result of his weakened state. Lee was later recognised by the Trinidad and Tobago government for his service to the nation and is remembered as a strong-willed individual who refused to let his injuries get the better of him.

In 2005, CONCACAF and CFU president Jack Warner proposed that Marvin Lee Stadium install an artificial playing surface, citing that it would bring more credibility for the region. Two years later, through a developmental grant from FIFA, Joe Public became the first Caribbean club to install an artificial playing surface, reportedly costing in excess of TT$8 million (US$600,000). The first game played on the newly installed playing surface, Joe Public faced Caledonia AIA in a TT Professional Football League match, which saw Caledonia AIA win a hard fought game 1–0 over the Eastern Lions.

Team management

Head Coach: Derek King
Asst Coach: Ralph Nelson
Asst Coach: Richard Mitchell
Team Manager: Roland Sampath
Trainer: David Prince
Physiotherapist: David Cumberbatch
Physiotherapist: Adisa Davis
Equipment Manager: Michael Williams

Honours
Domestic
TT Pro League: 3
1998, 2006, 2009

FA Trophy: 3
2001, 2007, 2009
Runner-up (2): 1999, 2000

First Citizens Cup: 0
Runner-up (2): 2008, 2009

TOYOTA Classic: 1
2007, 2009
Runner-up (1): 2005

Digicel Pro Bowl: 1
2009

Invitational
Kashif & Shanghai Knockout Tournament: 1
2007

International
CFU Club Championship: 2
1998, 2000
Runner-up (2): 2007, 2010

Year-by-year

†Joe Public voluntarily spent the 2004 and 2005 seasons in the National Super League. The Eastern Lions won the National Super League title in both years.

International Competition
1998 CFU Club Championship
Quarter-Finals v.  Notre Dame – 4:0
Semi-Finals v.  Waterhouse – 3:1
Final v.  Caledonia AIA Fire – 1:0

1998 CONCACAF Champions' Cup
Quarter-Finals v.  D.C. United – 0:8

1999 CONCACAF Champions' Cup
Quarter-Finals v.  Chicago Fire – 0:2

2000 CFU Club Championship
Group Stage v.  Guinness Harlem Bombers – 2:0
Group Stage v.  SV Robinhood – 5:0
Group Stage v.  RKV FC Sithoc – 7:0
Championship Group v.  Carioca – 1:1
Championship Group v.  Harbour View – 1:1
Championship Group v.  W Connection – 1:0

2000 CONCACAF Champions' Cup
Quarter-Finals v.  Pachuca – 0:1

Copa Finta Internacional (in Brazil)
Third place

2007 CFU Club Championship
Group Stage v.  Sagicor South East United – 5:0
Group Stage v.  SV Racing Club Aruba – 7:0
Quarter-Finals v.  Bassa – 4:0
Semi-Finals v.  Puerto Rico Islanders – 1:0
Final v.  Harbour View – 1:2

2008–09 CONCACAF Champions League
Preliminary Round v.  New England Revolution – 2:1, 4:0 (Joe Public F.C. advances 6:1 on aggregate)
Group Stage v.  Montreal Impact – 0:2, 1:4
Group Stage v.  Olimpia – 1:3, 0:4
Group Stage v.  Atlante – 1:0, 0:2

2010 CFU Club Championship
First Round v.  SV Leo Victor – 4:3
First Round v.  Avenues United – 6:0
First Round v.  Devonshire Cougars – 8:2
Second Round v.  Walking Boys – 5:0
Second Round v.  Systems 3 – 3:1
Final Round v.  San Juan Jabloteh – 1:0
Final Round v.  Puerto Rico Islanders – 1:1
Final Round v.  Bayamón – 1:3

2010–11 CONCACAF Champions League
Preliminary Round v.  Brujas – 2:2, 4:2 (Joe Public F.C. advances 6:4 on aggregate)
Group Stage v.  Municipal – 2:3, 1:1
Group Stage v.  Santos – 2:5, 1:5
Group Stage v.  Columbus Crew – 1:4, 0:3

References

External links
Official Website
Profile on Soca Warriors Online 

 
Football clubs in Trinidad and Tobago
1996 establishments in Trinidad and Tobago
Association football clubs established in 1996